David Patrick O'Hara (born 9 July 1965) is a Scottish stage and character actor. A graduate of the Royal Central School of Speech and Drama in London, he is best known to audiences for his numerous supporting roles in high-profile films; including Irishman Stephen in Braveheart, dimwitted mobster Fitzy in The Departed, hitman Mr. X in Wanted, and Albert Runcorn in Harry Potter and the Deathly Hallows – Part 1. He portrayed Det. Danny 'Mac' McGregor on The District, and Henry Howard, Earl of Surrey on The Tudors.

Early life
O'Hara was born in Glasgow, Scotland, the son of Martha (née Scott) and Patrick O'Hara, a construction worker. He lived with a large Catholic family, and was raised in the Pollok Housing Estate. His family was Catholic and of Irish descent. After leaving school he was accepted for a Youth Opportunities Programme, at a community theatre based at the Glasgow Arts Centre which toured local schools. At age 17, he moved to London to study at the Royal Central School of Speech and Drama, but left after two terms because of a shortage of funds. He went back to Scotland and landed a role in Bill Forsyth's Comfort and Joy, then returned to Central to finish his last term, where he was the understudy to Ralph Fiennes in A Midsummer Night's Dream.

Career 
O'Hara appeared in a number of Shakespearean productions, including Romeo and Juliet at the Regent Park Open-Air Theatre and The Comedy of Errors at The Pleasance. He spent a season with the Royal Shakespeare Company and the Barbican Centre, where he starred in Bite of the Night, which was directed by Danny Boyle. He appeared as the "mad" Irishman Stephen in Braveheart.

O'Hara had a featured role in the US series The District, which he left after one season to return to the UK. In 2006, O'Hara appeared as Fitzy, one of Jack Nicholson's chief mobsters in the Oscar-winning film The Departed.

In June 2009, O'Hara was filming The Tudors in Dublin.
He played Albert Runcorn and Harry Potter disguised as Runcorn in Harry Potter and the Deathly Hallows – Part 1. In April 2017, O'Hara appeared as Alistair Fitz in Marvel's Agents of S.H.I.E.L.D. as Leo Fitz's father.

Film

Television

References

External links
 

1965 births
Scottish male film actors
Scottish male television actors
Living people
Male actors from Glasgow
Alumni of the Royal Central School of Speech and Drama
20th-century Scottish male actors
21st-century Scottish male actors
Scottish people of Irish descent